Merouane Guerouabi (born 11 January 1989), often known as Bibich, is an Algerian actor and comedian.

Personal life
He was born on 11 January 1989 in Algiers, Algeria. His father El Hachemi Guerouabi was an Algerian singer and composer of Chaâbi and one of the Grand Masters of the Algiers-based Chaâbi music. Before the acting, he was a soccer player.

Career
After many unsuccessful castings, Guerouabi decided to write a first sketch which was broadcast it on the Internet in 2013 with the pseudonym MGDZ.

In 2017, he appeared in the television talk show Huitième Jour (J8).

Filmography

References

External links
 

Living people
Algerian male film actors
Algerian male television actors
Algerian male comedians
1989 births
21st-century Algerian male actors